Edward Anderson Stinson, Jr. (July 11, 1893 – January 26, 1932) was an American pilot and aircraft manufacturer. "Eddie" Stinson was the founder of Stinson Aircraft Company. At the time of his death in 1932 in an air crash, he was the world's most experienced pilot in flight hours, with over 16,000 hours logged.

Biography 
Stinson was born on July 11, 1893 in Fort Payne, Alabama. His oldest sister, Katherine, was an early female aviator, and he wanted to fly as well.  In September 1913, he learned to fly at the Wright School in Dayton, Ohio, from Roderick L. Wright.  He then helped support the family's Stinson School of Flying, at the Stinson Municipal Airport, earning his FAI certificate in 1915.  In World War I, he served as a flight instructor for the United States Army Air Corps at Kelly Field. In 1921, he set a world endurance record for flight, and the following year, he worked as a test pilot for the Stout Engineering Company, becoming the test pilot for the all-metal Stout ST-1 bomber.

In 1925, Stinson led a group of Detroit investors in building a new commercial aircraft, forming the Stinson Aircraft Syndicate. The prototype SB-1 Detroiter made its first test flight on 25 January 1926, and its first public flight in early February. This would lead to a series of successful aircraft designs built by the Stinson Aircraft Company.

Stinson moved into a large home in Dearborn, Michigan, where he lived until his death.

Stinson died from injuries sustained while making an emergency landing in the prototype Stinson Model R. He was making a demonstration flight from Chicago when the aircraft ran out of fuel over Lake Michigan. The aircraft's wing sheared off after striking a flagpole while attempting to land on a golf course. Three other passengers were injured.

References

Sources

American aviation businesspeople
Aviators from Alabama
People from Fort Payne, Alabama
Aviators killed in aviation accidents or incidents in the United States
Members of the Early Birds of Aviation
1893 births
1932 deaths
Wright Flying School alumni
Flight endurance record holders
American aviation record holders